Rhys Edward Clark (born 17 September 1946) is a New Zealand drummer who, since moving to the United States in 1970, has played with such artists as Hoyt Axton, Freddy Fender and, most notably, Billy Joel.

Biography
Clark's career as a drummer began when he was a teenager in New Zealand. In 1963, he became the drummer for the Zodiacs, followed by a 1964 stint with The Chequers. In 1965, he joined the Auckland-based pop band, The Silhouettes, who had a number of local hits, as well as a national hit with "Theme From The Endless Summer". He was also a founding member of the very successful Australian pop band, The Executives. Between 1966 and 1969, the Executives had a number of hit records, performed throughout Australia, and appeared on many television shows, including their own nationwide television specials, as well as in a number of commercials for such companies as Coca-Cola, Qantas, P&O and Revlon. In 1969, the Executives recorded an album in the United States, but they disbanded shortly thereafter. Some of the band members returned to Australia, but Clark stayed in the States and became a Los Angeles-based session musician.

Between 1971 and 1975, Clark toured with Billy Joel and worked on his albums Cold Spring Harbor and Piano Man. Clark was also the drummer on Joel's breakthrough Sigma Sound radio concert, broadcast on WMMR-FM in April 1972, as well as at the Mar y Sol Festival two weeks prior, where they played to a crowd of 50,000. After his time with Joel, Clark ultimately hooked up with Hoyt Axton, and toured and recorded with him from 1979 through 1999. In the 1990s, he also began touring with Freddy Fender, as well as the Texas Tornados, which he did until Fender died in late 2006. Since 2006, Clark has performed with a number of artists, such as Johnny Rodriguez, Sam the Sham, Charlie Rich Jr., Jann Browne, Chris Gaffney, Sweethearts of the Rodeo, Rosie Flores, Wanda Jackson, Michael Chain and Rick Shea.

In September, 2013, Clark reunited with his former Billy Joel bandmates, Larry Russell and Don Evans, along with singers/piano players, David Clark and Elio Pace, to re-create the WMMR/Sigma Sound concert that jump-started Joel's career. They did two sold-out performances of "Long Long Time: A Historic Tribute to Billy Joel", in New York, and in Philadelphia where the original show was broadcast. A documentary and CD will be released in early 2014 with more shows to follow.

Partial discography

ALBUMS
 1967 – The Executives – The Executives
 1968 – The Executives – The Executives on Bandstand
 1968 – The Executives – ...Now!
 1970 – The Executives – Inner Sense
 1971 – Kyle – Times That Try A Man's Soul
 1971 – Burton & Cunico – Strive, Seek, Find
 1971 – Billy Joel – Cold Spring Harbor
 1972 – Peter Anders – Peter Anders
 1972 – Captain Beefheart – The Spotlight Kid
 1973 – Billy Joel – Piano Man
 1981 – Hoyt Axton – Live!
 1981 – Hoyt Axton – Silk Cut Festival
 1982 – Hoyt Axton – Pistol Packin' Mama
 1984 – Hoyt Axton – American Dreams
 1985 – Billy Joel – Greatest Hits: Volume I & Volume II
 1986 – Hoyt Axton – Greatest Hits
 1988 – Re Winkler, Anne Harvey, Ree Van Vleck – A Town South of Bakersfield, Vol. 2
 1989 – The Executives – The Happening World of the Executives: The Festival File Vol. 12
 1989 – Billy Joel – Souvenir: The Ultimate Collection
 1990 – Hoyt Axton – Spin of the Wheel
 1991 – Jann Browne – It Only Hurts When I Laugh
 1991 – Billy Truitt & The Barnstormers – Billy Truitt & The Barnstormers
 1997 – Billy Joel – Complete Hits Collection 1973–1997
 1998 – The Executives – So You Wanna Be A Rock 'N' Roll Star
 2000 – Gailyn Addis – Gailyn Addis
 2001 – Billy Joel – The Essential Billy Joel
 2002 – Billy Joel – The Collection
 2002 – The Executives – Peculiar Hole in the Sky: Pop Psych From Down Under
 2004 – The Silhouettes – Very Best of Kiwi Instrumentals
 2004 – Billy Joel – Piano Man: The Very Best of Billy Joel
 2004 – Chris DeMarco – Lost And Found
 2005 – Billy Joel – My Lives
 2007 – Rio Rocko – Rio Rocko
 2011 – Billy Joel – Billy Joel: The Complete Albums
 2011 – Billy Joel – Piano Man (Legacy Edition)
 2013 – Billy Joel – Original Album Classics

EPS

 1967 – The Executives – The Executives Break Out
 1968 – The Executives – It's A Happening World
 1968 – The Executives – Windy Day
 1969 – The Executives – Parenthesis
 1969 – The Executives – Things Go Better With Coca-Cola

SINGLES

 1965 – The Silhouettes – "Theme From The Endless Summer" / "P.S. I Love You"
 1965 – The Silhouettes – "Yes It's Time" / "Milkman"
 1966 – The Silhouettes – "There She Is" / "Where Have You Been All My Life"
 1966 – The Executives – "Wander Boy" / "You're Bad"
 1967 – The Executives – "My Aim Is To Please You" / "Bad Reputation"
 1967 – The Executives – "Sit Down, I Think I Love You" / "Don't You Sometimes, Baby, Find That I'm on Your Mind"
 1968 – The Executives – "It's A Happening World" / "Moving in a Circle"
 1968 – The Executives – "Windy Day" / "This Town Ain't The Same Any More"
 1969 – The Executives – "Christopher Robin" / "Summerhill Road"
 1969 – The Executives – "Parenthesis" / "Got My Woman"
 1970 – Frank Day Habit – "Hey Man" / "You're Gonna Love Me"

References

External links 
 Rhys Clark at Discogs

1946 births
American rock drummers
American session musicians
Australian rock drummers
Male drummers
Living people
New Zealand drummers
New Zealand expatriates in Australia
New Zealand expatriates in the United States
Musicians from Auckland
People from Los Angeles
New Zealand session musicians
Australian session musicians
20th-century American drummers
American male drummers
20th-century American male musicians
Billy Joel Band members